

Rob Trip (born 9 March 1960) is a Dutch journalist and presenter. Since 2010 he is a news anchor of the eight o'clock news of NOS Journaal, the Dutch public news broadcaster.

See also
 List of news presenters

References

External links
 
 

1960 births
Living people
People from Haarlem
Dutch television journalists
Dutch television presenters
Dutch television news presenters
Dutch radio presenters
Dutch radio journalists